Lövstad Castle is a château situated near Norrköping, the province of Östergötland, Sweden. The name is sometimes spelled Löfstad, which is according to old Swedish spelling rules.

Lövstad originated in the 15th century, but the present building was erected in the 17th century by Axel Lillie (1603–1662). It came to the von Fersen family through Hedvig Catharina De la Gardie (1695–1745) who was the heir of her mother Hedvig Catharina Lillie  (1695-1745)  and to the Piper Family through Countess Sophie Piper (1757–1816), wife of Chamberlain  Adolf Ludwig Piper (1750–1795) and  sister of Count Axel von Fersen (1755–1810).

The present interior remained intact until the death of the last owner,  Emilie Piper (1857-1926). Lövstad came under the ownership of the Östergötlands museum  in 1940. The castle was opened to the public in 1942. Lövstad is today a museum open with guided tours.

References

External links
 Lofstad official website
Östergötlands museum official website

Castles in Östergötland County
Museums in Östergötland County
Historic house museums in Sweden